Microwave Tube Research & Development Centre (MTRDC) is a laboratory of the Defence Research & Development Organization (DRDO) in Bangalore. Its primary function is research and development of microwave power products.

References

External links
 DRDO

Defence Research and Development Organisation laboratories
Research institutes in Bangalore
Research institutes established in 1984
1984 establishments in Karnataka